Piero Scesa (28 February 1939 – 18 April 2022) was an Italian professional footballer who played as a full back for Novara, Torino and Mantova.

References

1939 births
2022 deaths
Italian footballers
Novara F.C. players
Torino F.C. players
Mantova 1911 players
Serie B players
Serie A players
Association football fullbacks